Pogost  (from Old East Slavic: погостъ) is a historical term with several meanings in the Russian language. It has also been borrowed into Latgalian (pogosts), Finnish (pogosta) and Latvian (pagasts), with specific meanings.

The original usage applies to the coaching inn for princes and ecclesiastics with the word being similar to modern Russian gost (гость),  "guest". It is assumed that originally pogosts were rural communities on the periphery of the ancient Rus` state, as well as trading centers (Old Russian: gost'ba, гостьба).

In the end of the 10th century pogosts transformed into administrative and territorial districts. Pogosts varied in size, ranging from tens to hundreds of villages in 11th—14th centuries. As Christianity spread in Russia, churches were built in pogosts. In 1775 the last pogosts that served as administrative districts were destroyed. Since then they became known as city pogosts (погосто - место), functioning as parish centers.

In the central uyezds of 15th-16th centuries pogosts were small settlements with a church and a graveyard, like Kizhi Pogost or Kadnikov Pogost. In modern Russian, pogosts usually designate a combination of a rural church and a graveyard, situated at some distant place.

Usage in Finland and Latvia
The central village of the Finnish kunta (‘municipality’) of Ilomantsi is usually called the pogosta of Ilomantsi (Ilomantsin pogosta), the word being obviously a borrowing from Russian. The local dialect of Finnish shows strong Russian influence, and there is a strong presence of Orthodox Christians in the municipality. Even the name of the local newspaper is Pogostan Sanomat ("The Pogosta News"), and a certain viral disease is locally called the Pogosta disease.

In modern Finnish language, pogosta is also used in references to historical places, as a historical synonym for "parish" or "municipality" in Karelian and Russian contexts.Pagasts''' is the name for a basic unit of local self-government in the Republic of Latvia.  The word "pagasts" is a commonly used Latvian word equivalent to civil parish, rural municipality or small rural district, originating in the  Russian pogost. There are 432 rural municipalities or pagasti'' in Latvia.

References

History of the administrative divisions of Russia
Rural geography
Russian-language designations of territorial entities